Leonard Illarionovich Adamov (10 March 1941 – 9 November 1977) was a Ukrainian and Soviet football player. He committed suicide by jumping out of his apartment window.

Honours 
 Soviet Top League winner: 1962.

International career 
Adamov played his only game for USSR on 4 September 1965 in a friendly against Yugoslavia.

External links 
  Profile

1941 births
1977 deaths
Soviet footballers
Association football forwards
Soviet Union international footballers
Suicides by jumping in Belarus
Suicides in the Soviet Union
FC Spartak Moscow players
FC Dinamo Minsk players
Soviet Top League players
Soviet football managers
1977 suicides